Pomeranchuk cooling (named after Isaak Pomeranchuk) is the phenomenon in which liquid helium-3 will cool if it is compressed isentropically when it is below 0.3 K. This occurs because helium-3 has the unique property that solidification below 0.3 K requires pressure. The effect was first observed by Yuri Anufriev in 1965. This can be used to construct a cryogenic cooler.

In 2021 an analog effect has been observed on twisted bilayer graphene and in TMDs

References

Cryogenics